The Coharie Intra-tribal Council, Inc. is a state-recognized tribe in North Carolina. The headquarters are in Clinton, North Carolina.

Formerly known as the Coharie Indian People, Inc. and the Coharie Tribe of North Carolina, the group's 2,700 members primarily live in Sampson and Harnett counties.

The group claims "descent from certain tribes of Indians originally inhabiting the coastal regions of North Carolina." In 1910, residents of Herrings Township along the Coharie creeks identified as being of Croatan descent.

Nonprofit organization 
In 1978, Coharie Intra Tribal Inc. formed as 501(c)(3) nonprofit organization based in Clinton, North Carolina, and Freddie Carter serves as the organization's principal officer. Its mission is to "provide housing, economic development, health, social services assistance and maintenance of the tribal roll for the members of the Coharie Tribe." They have four employees.

The organization operates a HUD/NAHASDA housing project with $557,380 in revenue and $550,186 in expenses for 20 unites. Another program removed debris from the Coharie River after a hurricane, and another provided COVID-19 relief to members.

Leadership positions, as of 2019, included:
 Executive Director: Greg Jacobs
 Chairperson: Freddie Carter.

State recognition 
In 1911, North Carolina first recognized the Croatan Indians of Samson County.

The state of North Carolina formalized its recognition process for Native American tribes and created the North Carolina Commission of Indian Affairs (NCCIA) in 1971. North Carolina formally recognized the Coharie Tribe of North Carolina as a state-recognized tribe on July 20, 1971.

The current administration includes:
 Chief: Ammie Gordon
 Executive Director: Greg Jacobs
 Tribal Enrollment Officer: JaNella Williams.

Petition for federal recognition 
Romie G. Simmons sent a letter of intent to petition for federal recognition on behalf of the Coharie Intra-tribal Council, Inc., on March 13, 1981; however, the organization never followed through with a petition for federal recognition as a Native American tribe.

Activities
The Coharie Indian Cultural Pow Wow takes place in every September every year.

E. Sequoyah Simermeyer, a member of the Coharie Intra-tribal Council and Navajo descendant, served as a Government Affairs Group Associate with the National Congress of American Indians and became a counsel to the assistant secretary in the US Department of the Interior Bureau of Indian Affairs in 2007.

See also 
 George Edwin Butler, author
 Dark Water Rising, a Coharie and Lumbee indie/blues band

Further reading 
 The Croatan Indians of Sampson County, North Carolina: Their Origin and Racial Status

Notes

External links
 
 North Carolina Commission of Indian Affairs

1911 establishments in North Carolina
1975 establishments in North Carolina
Cultural organizations based in North Carolina
Non-profit organizations based in North Carolina
State-recognized tribes in the United States